Jasmin Stewart (born 4 November 1998) is a retired Australian rules footballer who played for the Fremantle Football Club in the AFL Women's (AFLW). Stewart was drafted by Fremantle with their first selection, 4th overall, in the 2018 AFL Women's draft. 

Stewart was born in Northam, Western Australia, but lived in Kambalda and the Pilbara, she attended St Mary's Anglican Girls' School as a boarder. She did not play an AFLW game during her first season with Fremantle, but made her debut in the first game of the 2020 season. It was announced she re-signed with the Dockers on 5 June 2021.

Stewart retired from senior football in April 2022.

Statistics
Statistics are correct to the end of the 2021 season.

|- 
| scope="row" text-align:center | 2020
| 
| 7 || 7 || 3 || 0 || 51 || 19 || 70 || 9 || 20 || 0.4 || 0.0 || 7.3 || 2.7 || 10.0 || 1.3 || 2.9 || 2
|- style="background:#EAEAEA"
| scope="row" text-align:center | 2021
| 
| 7 || 10 || 2 || 3 || 52 || 27 || 79 || 14 || 24 || 0.2 || 0.3 || 5.2 || 2.7 || 7.9 || 1.4 || 2.4 || 0
|- class="sortbottom"
! colspan=3 | Career
! 15
! 0
! 0
! 93
! 22
! 115
! 33
! 23
! 0.0
! 0.0
! 6.2
! 1.5
! 7.7
! 2.2
! 1.5
! 0
|}

References

External links 

1998 births
Living people
Fremantle Football Club (AFLW) players
Australian rules footballers from Western Australia
People educated at St Mary's Anglican Girls' School
Indigenous Australian players of Australian rules football